Tenna or Kinnarøya is an island in the municipality of Herøy in Nordland county, Norway. It is traversed by Norwegian County Road 161, which also connects it to the neighboring island of Sør-Herøy, crossing Tennsundet (Tenna Strait) over the Tennsund Bridge. To the south lies Andøysundet (Andøya Strait). The Husvær islands lie to the southwest of Tenna; they are connected to Tenna by a ferry.

See also
List of islands of Norway

References

Islands of Nordland
Herøy, Nordland